Pernikoff Brothers is an American rock band from St. Louis, Missouri. The band consists of brothers Tom (vocals, guitar) and Rick Pernikoff (vocals, bass), and Dan Germain (drums, vocals).

They self-released their debut album, On My Way, in 2011 and recorded their second album with producer Brian Deck (Modest Mouse, Iron & Wine, Fruit Bats, Gomez, Counting Crows, etc.) at Steve Albini's Electrical Audio Studios in Chicago, IL. Release date TBD.

History
Pernikoff Brothers first began performing as a duo in the Bay Area. In 2009, they were joined by drummer, Dan Germain, from Boston, MA. The band recorded their self-produced debut On My Way at Ocean Way Nashville with engineer Ben Fowler, who also mixed the album. On My Way was officially released May 2011. Since the release, the Pernikoff Brothers have played with acts such as Willie Nelson, G. Love, Tim Reynolds (of the Dave Matthews Band), Lukas Nelson & Promise of the Real, Railroad Earth and Toots & the Maytals. They were invited to perform at the BMI stage at the 2011 Austin City Limits Music Festival, the BMI showcase at the 2011 CMJ Music Marathon, and the Key West Songwriter's Festival.

Band members
 Tom Pernikoff – vocals, guitar, mandolin, banjo
 Rick Pernikoff – vocals, bass, guitar, banjo, piano, harmonica
 Dan Germain – drums, percussion, accordion, vocals

Discography
 On My Way (2011)
 Unreleased (2012)
Miss Fortune Teller (2013)

See also

References

External links

 

Rock music groups from Missouri
Jam bands
Musical groups from St. Louis
Musical groups established in 2009
American musical trios